Cukurs C.6bis was a Latvian prototype dive bomber aircraft designed by Herberts Cukurs in 1940.

Development 

The aircraft was based on the Cukurs C.6 Trīs zvaigznes (Three stars) trainer which was known for its 1937 flight from Riga to Tokyo and return.

Work on the C.6bis started in 1939, with the first test flights in 1940. Soon after first test flights the Latvian Air Force accepted the aircraft and ordered twelve.

Test flights were halted on the 7 June 1940, just 10 days before the Soviet occupation of Latvia in 1940. During the occupation the Red Army expressed interest in the C.6bis and test flew it, but they determined that it was unsuitable for use.

Only one example was built and its fate remains unknown.

Specifications (C.6bis)

References 

1930s Latvian bomber aircraft
Aircraft first flown in 1940